Stephan Patrick Bonnar (April 4, 1977 – December 22, 2022) was an American mixed martial artist. Bonnar competed as a Light Heavyweight in the UFC for most of his career. Bonnar was the runner-up on The Ultimate Fighter 1, his TUF Ultimate Finale loss to Forrest Griffin is widely considered to be the most important fight in the history of the UFC.

Early life and education 
Bonnar was born in Hammond, Indiana, and raised in Munster, Indiana, attending Munster High School. Bonnar had an extensive background in combat sports, beginning with Wrestling when he was 10 years old, Tae Kwon Do at age 12, Brazilian Jiu-jitsu at age 22, and then added Boxing and Muay Thai when he was 24 years old. He earned his black belt in Tae Kwon Do at the age of 16 and was a two-time Golden Gloves Champion in the Super Heavyweight division. He attended and graduated from Purdue University in 2000, earning a degree in Sports Medicine.

Early career
Bonnar began training Brazilian jiu-jitsu with Carlson Gracie during the summer of 1999, under whom he received his purple belt. Bonnar also trained in Muay Thai during several trips to Thailand. Since the beginning of 2010 Bonnar trained in Muay Thai in Las Vegas under Master One Kick Nick Blomgren at One Kick's Gym.

Mixed martial arts career

Ultimate Fighting Championship

Due to his strong performance in the Light Heavyweight finals, where he lost a unanimous decision to Forrest Griffin in a back and forth fight, Bonnar was awarded a six-figure UFC contract along with Griffin. After his loss to Griffin, Bonnar became the staple of the regular UFC Ultimate Fight Night shows at the Hard Rock Hotel and Casino in Las Vegas, defeating such notables as Sam Hoger, James Irvin and Keith Jardine before succumbing to Rashad Evans by majority decision. In 2006 Bonnar lost a unanimous decision against Forrest Griffin in the long-anticipated rematch at UFC 62. After UFC 62, Bonnar tested positive for the banned substance Boldenone, a type of anabolic steroid. The commission issued a nine-month suspension on Bonnar's fighter's license and fined him $5,000.

Bonnar was forced to withdraw from his fight against Matt Hamill at UFC Fight Night 13 due to a serious knee injury he suffered during training. He returned to action at UFC 94 against Jon Jones, which resulted in a loss via decision. In his next fight at UFC 100 Bonnar lost a unanimous decision to Mark Coleman.

Bonnar mentioned on the MMA Live Post Fight Show for UFC 101 that he was considering a drop down to Middleweight after two disappointing losses at Light Heavyweight. Despite this, Bonnar next faced Krzysztof Soszynski on February 21, 2010 at UFC 110. Soszynski was victorious at 1:04 in the third round, due to TKO (Cut). Video replays that showed that the cut was opened up by a clash of heads led Bonnar to appeal referee John Sharp's decision. It was announced on March 10 that he had lost the appeal and the result would stand as a TKO win for Soszynski.

At UFC 116, Bonnar won the rematch with a second-round TKO against Soszynski after catching him with a knee. The win broke Bonnar's three fight losing streak, bringing his UFC record to 6-6. The fight earned Bonnar and Soszynski Fight of the Night honors alongside Yoshihiro Akiyama and Chris Leben's fight.

Bonnar fought Igor Pokrajac on December 4, 2010 at The Ultimate Fighter 12 Finale. He won the bout via unanimous decision (29–26, 29–26, and 29–26).

Bonnar was expected to face Karlos Vemola on August 14, 2011 at UFC on Versus 5. However, Bonnar was forced to withdraw from the bout due to an injury and was replaced by Ronny Markes.

Bonnar faced Kyle Kingsbury on November 19, 2011 at UFC 139.
Bonnar defeated Kingsbury by unanimous decision (30–27, 30–25, and 30–27).

With the UFC needing to replace the main event at UFC 153, they turned to Bonnar and Anderson Silva to fill the spot left empty by injuries. The two UFC vets squared off in a Light Heavyweight match October 13, 2012 in Rio de Janeiro, Brazil. Silva won the fight via TKO. Bonnar tested positive for anabolic steroids after the fight (Drostanolone). After his loss to Silva it was announced on October 30, 2012 by UFC president Dana White that Bonnar had retired from MMA competition.

UFC Hall of Fame
Shortly after the announcement of Forrest Griffin's retirement, Dana White announced that Bonnar and Griffin would be inducted into the UFC Hall of Fame. Bonnar and Griffin were officially inducted on July 6, 2013.

Bellator MMA
On August 27, 2014, Bellator announced they had signed Bonnar to a multi-fight deal, seemingly coming out of retirement. Bonnar faced Tito Ortiz on November 15, 2014 at Bellator 131 and lost via split decision. 
Thereafter, Bonnar retired for a second time.

Professional wrestling career

Independent circuit (2017–2021)
On April 8, 2017 Stephan made his pro wrestling debut at Smashmouth Pro Wrestling's event Smashfest in a Battle Royal. On August 1, 2017, House of Glory, a New York City independent wrestling company announced that Bonnar would be stepping into a wrestling ring for the first time ever to face another former UFC fighter and independent wrestler, Matt Riddle. However, Riddle backed out and he faced Sho Tanaka from NJPW instead. On December 2, 2017, "Speedball" Mike Bailey defeated Bonnar at IWS Season's Beatings in Montreal.

Impact Wrestling (2017, 2019)
Bonnar made his Impact Wrestling debut on November 5, 2017 teaming with Moose losing to King Mo and Bobby Lashley at Bound for Glory (2017) in Ottawa, Canada.

On September 14, 2019, Bonnar faced Moose in a losing effort at Impact Wrestling's Victory Road 2019.

During the Impact Wrestling October tapings from Las Vegas, Bonnar faced Moose in a repeat of their contest from Victory Road. The rematch was used as part of Moose's buildup towards a match against
Ken Shamrock at Bound for Glory later that month. The commentators said that Bonnar had been chosen as he was from a similar background and is a similar type of wrestler to Shamrock, therefore viewed as an ideal warmup for Moose. However, Shamrock then made an unexpected appearance after Moose disqualifies himself from the match by attacking the referee, Shamrock then put Moose in his signature ankle lock.

Personal life 
Bonnar and his longtime girlfriend were married on October 30, 2009, in Tuscany, Italy. The couple have one son, Griffin Brandon, named after Forrest Griffin and in memory of Andrea's late brother, Brandon Brown.

He was asthmatic.

Bonnar was a fan of the rock band The Who and used their song "Eminence Front" as his entrance music to his UFC fights. Outside of competition, Bonnar has done commentary work for televised mixed martial arts programming, notably serving as the WEC's color commentator for most of 2010, calling 5 of their final 7 cards. He has also made appearances as an analyst on the ESPN2 series MMA Live and for UFC broadcasts on the Fox television networks.

After retiring from the mixed martial arts, Bonnar was appointed the president of North Star Combat, a Minnesota-based MMA promotion.

Legal issues
On October 28, 2018, Bonnar was arrested in Nevada and charged with DUI. At approximately 1:15 p.m., the Nevada highway patrol received multiple reports that there was a red Cadillac, a vehicle owned and being driven by Bonnar, observed driving recklessly and making unsafe lane changes. When the NHP arrived on scene, they witnessed Bonnar had both hands tied and strung up to each side of his inside car handles. The pedestrians on scene said he attempted to flee the scene of the accident, so they were forced to "hog tie" him to the inside of his wrecked vehicle. This entire exchange was recorded via the responding officer's body cam and aired on the television shows season 4 of PD Cam. Officers also claimed that they could smell alcohol on Bonnar's breath and inside of Bonnar's vehicle. Bonnar was arrested on scene, refused to comply or respond to officers commands, and had to be carried and laid inside the back of the patrol car. He was then taken to the Clark County detention center where he was charged with DUI and resisting arrest.

Death
Bonnar died on December 22, 2022
, at the age of 45. UFC issued a statement suggesting it was presumed that Bonnar had died of a heart complication while at work.

Championships and accomplishments

Mixed martial arts
Ultimate Fighting Championship
The Ultimate Fighter 1 (Runner-up)
Fight of the Night (One time) vs. Krzysztof Soszynski on July 3, 2010
UFC Hall of Fame (Fight Wing, Class of 2013) vs. Forrest Griffin at The Ultimate Fighter 1 Finale
Wrestling Observer Newsletter
Fight of the Year (2005) vs. Forrest Griffin on April 9

Professional wrestling
 World Class Revolution
 WCR Heavyweight Championship (1 time)

Mixed martial arts record

|-
| Loss
| align=center| 15–9
| Tito Ortiz
| Decision (split)
| Bellator 131
| 
| align=center| 3
| align=center| 5:00
| San Diego, California, United States
| 
|-
| Loss
| align=center| 15–8
| Anderson Silva
| TKO (knees to the body and punches)
| UFC 153
| 
| align=center| 1
| align=center| 4:40
| Rio de Janeiro, Brazil
| 
|-
| Win
| align=center| 15–7
| Kyle Kingsbury
| Decision (unanimous)
| UFC 139
| 
| align=center| 3
| align=center| 5:00
| San Jose, California, United States
| 
|-
| Win
| align=center| 14–7
| Igor Pokrajac
| Decision (unanimous)
| The Ultimate Fighter 12 Finale
| 
| align=center| 3
| align=center| 5:00
| Las Vegas, Nevada, United States
| 
|-
| Win
| align=center| 13–7
| Krzysztof Soszynski
| TKO (punches)
| UFC 116
| 
| align=center| 2
| align=center| 3:08
| Las Vegas, Nevada, United States
| 
|-
| Loss
| align=center| 12–7
| Krzysztof Soszynski
| TKO (doctor stoppage)
| UFC 110
| 
| align=center| 3
| align=center| 1:04
| Sydney, Australia
| 
|-
| Loss
| align=center| 12–6
| Mark Coleman
| Decision (unanimous)
| UFC 100
| 
| align=center| 3
| align=center| 5:00
| Las Vegas, Nevada, United States
| 
|-
| Loss
| align=center| 12–5
| Jon Jones
| Decision (unanimous)
| UFC 94
| 
| align=center| 3
| align=center| 5:00
| Las Vegas, Nevada, United States
| 
|-
| Win
| align=center| 12–4
| Eric Schafer
| TKO (punches)
| UFC 77
| 
| align=center| 2
| align=center| 2:47
| Cincinnati, Ohio, United States
| 
|-
| Win
| align=center| 11–4
| Mike Nickels
| Submission (rear-naked choke)
| UFC 73
| 
| align=center| 1
| align=center| 2:14
| Sacramento, California, United States
| 
|-
| Loss
| align=center| 10–4
| Forrest Griffin
| Decision (unanimous)
| UFC 62: Liddell vs. Sobral
| 
| align=center| 3
| align=center| 5:00
| Las Vegas, Nevada, United States
| 
|-
| Loss
| align=center| 10–3
| Rashad Evans
| Decision (majority)
| UFC Fight Night 5
| 
| align=center| 3
| align=center| 5:00
| Las Vegas, Nevada, United States
| 
|-
| Win
| align=center| 10–2
| Keith Jardine
| Decision (unanimous)
| UFC Fight Night 4
| 
| align=center| 3
| align=center| 5:00
| Las Vegas, Nevada, United States
| 
|-
| Win
| align=center| 9–2
| James Irvin
| Submission (kimura)
| UFC Fight Night 3
| 
| align=center| 1
| align=center| 4:30
| Las Vegas, Nevada, United States
| 
|-
| Win
| align=center| 8–2
| Sam Hoger
| Decision (unanimous)
| UFC Ultimate Fight Night
| 
| align=center| 3
| align=center| 5:00
| Las Vegas, Nevada, United States
| 
|-
| Loss
| align=center| 7–2
| Forrest Griffin
| Decision (unanimous)
| The Ultimate Fighter 1 Finale
| 
| align=center| 3
| align=center| 5:00
| Las Vegas, Nevada, United States
| 
|-
| Win
| align=center| 7–1
| Sean Sallee
| Submission (triangle choke)
| IHC 7-The Crucible
| 
| align=center| 1
| align=center| 2:28
| Hammond, Indiana, United States
| 
|-
| Win
| align=center| 6–1
| William Hill
| TKO (punches)
| Total Fight Challenge 1
| 
| align=center| 1
| align=center| N/A
| Hammond, Indiana, United States
| 
|-
| Win
| align=center| 5–1
| Brad Lynde
| Submission (rear-naked choke)
| IHC 6: Inferno
| 
| align=center| 1
| align=center| 4:10
| Hammond, Indiana, United States
| 
|-
| Loss
| align=center| 4–1
| Lyoto Machida
| TKO (doctor stoppage)
| Jungle Fight 1
| 
| align=center| 1
| align=center| 4:21
| Manaus, Brazil
| 
|-
| Win
| align=center| 4–0
| Terry Martin
| Decision (unanimous)
| Maximum Fighting Challenge
| 
| align=center| 1
| align=center| 10:00
| Hammond, Indiana, United States
| 
|-
| Win
| align=center| 3–0
| Jay Massey
| Submission (guillotine choke)
| UA 1: The Genesis
| 
| align=center| 1
| align=center| 1:09
| Hammond, Indiana, United States
| 
|-
| Win
| align=center| 2–0
| Josh Kruger
| Submission (armbar)
| IHC 3: Exodus
| 
| align=center| 1
| align=center| 2:55
| Hammond, Indiana, United States
| 
|-
| Win
| align=center| 1–0
| Brian Ebersole
| Submission (guillotine choke)
| IHC 3: Exodus
| 
| align=center| 1
| align=center| 0:51
| Hammond, Indiana, United States
|

See also
List of Bellator MMA alumni
The Ultimate Fighter

References

External links

Ironheart Crown official site

1977 births
2022 deaths
American male mixed martial artists
Light heavyweight mixed martial artists
Mixed martial artists from Indiana
Mixed martial arts broadcasters
American sportspeople in doping cases
Doping cases in mixed martial arts
American practitioners of Brazilian jiu-jitsu
People awarded a black belt in Brazilian jiu-jitsu
American male taekwondo practitioners
Mixed martial artists utilizing taekwondo
Mixed martial artists utilizing boxing
Mixed martial artists utilizing Brazilian jiu-jitsu
Purdue University alumni
Sportspeople from Hammond, Indiana
People from Munster, Indiana
Ultimate Fighting Championship male fighters